Sirius.B is an eight-piece musical group from Asheville, NC.  It was formed in late 2006 by Xavier Ferdón, Pancho Romero Bond, and Imhotep and takes its name from the white dwarf star, Sirius B.  The band describes itself as "Absurdist Gypsy Folk Funk Punk".  Sirius.B combines accordion, violin, cello, acoustic guitar, flamenco and electric guitar, charango, banjo, percussion, drums, upright bass, melodica, clarinet, and multi-lingual vocals to create a sound that has a gypsy feel, but with elements from other modern genres.

In the Mountain Xpress's Best of Western North Carolina for 2017, Sirius.B was voted:

 No. 1 Favorite All-Around Band

In the Mountain Xpress's Best of Western North Carolina for 2015, Sirius.B was voted:

 No. 1 Favorite All-Around Band
 No. 3 Rock Band

In the Mountain Xpress's Best of Western North Carolina for 2014, Sirius.B was voted:

 No. 1 Favorite All-Around Band
 No. 1 Acoustic/Folk Band (tie)
 No. 1 Rock Band

In the Mountain Xpress's Best of Western North Carolina for 2013, Sirius.B was voted:

 No. 1 Favorite All-Around Band
 No. 1 Acoustic/Folk Band
 No. 1 Rock Band
 No. 3 World Music Band

In the Mountain Xpress's Best of Western North Carolina for 2012, Sirius.B was voted:

 No. 1 Favorite Local Band
 No. 1 Local Gypsy Absurdist Punk Rock Band
 No. 3 Local Band: Acoustic / Folk

In the Mountain Xpress's Best of Western North Carolina for 2011, Sirius.B was voted:

 No. 1 Next Big Thing
 No. 1 Local Band: Rock
 No. 2 Favorite Local Band
 No. 2 Local Band: Acoustic/Folk

In the Mountain Xpress's Best of Western North Carolina for 2010, Sirius.B was voted:

 No. 1 Next Big Thing
 No. 2 Experimental Band
 No. 2 Rock Band

In the Mountain Xpress's Best of Western North Carolina for 2009, Sirius.B was voted:
 No. 1 Rock Band
 No. 1 Experimental Band (tie)
 No. 2 Indie Band
 No. 3 Live Show of 2009 - (Beating Sirius.B for Best Live Show were the Beastie Boys and Phish.)

In addition, Sirius.B also won awards in the Best of WNC 2007 and Best of WNC 2008.  Mountain Xpress writes, "folk-punk artists Sirius B are, according to Xpress readers, the ones to watch."

Sirius.B's songs can be heard on regional radio stations such as 88.7FM WNCW, 105.9FM The Mountain, 98.1FM The River, 880AM The Revolution, and Power 90.5FM. They have also made a live appearance on the WDVX Knoxville Blue Plate Special, which has hosted other artists such as Bela Fleck and The Avett Brothers.

In addition to the Asheville area, they tour regionally to venues in Atlanta and Athens, GA; Columbia and Charleston, SC; and Knoxville and Johnson City, TN. They often host ticket sales on their main website. The Mountain Xpress states that "The excitement of a Sirius.B show has been compared by the press to what 'one would imagine Athens’s 40 Watt Club to have been like in the early days of R.E.M."

Their original album, "Dazzling Urbanites" was released on May 3, 2008.

Their second album, "Monkey Robot Soldier" was released on March 27, 2010.

Their third album, "The Triumphant Return of Black-Eyed Norman" was recorded at Echo Mountain Recording Studio and released on September 28, 2012, after raising $9,150 through their Kickstarter campaign.

Line-up

Current members
Pancho Romero Bond - Vocals, Acoustic Guitar, Kazoo
Xavier Ferdón – Guitar, Chromatic Button Accordion, Charango, Banjo, Vocals
Franklin Keel - Cello, Vocals
Ryan Kijanka - Upright Bass, Vocals
Lauren Baker - Vocals, Melodica, Musical Saw
Mike Oliver - Percussion
Drayton Aldridge - Violin
Mattick Frick - Percussion, Vocals

In the Asheville Symphony Orchestra Franklin Keel is the Assistant Principal Cellist.

Franklin Keel is also a member of Upland Drive and the Opal String Quartet.

Ryan Kijanka is a member of Upland Drive.

Former members
Imhotep - Percussion
Brian Hermanson - Clarinet
Lee Stanford - Violin, Vocals
Bryshen Brothwell - Accordion, Upright Bass, Piano
Rachael Kistler - Violin
Amy Lovinger - Violin
Mike Morel - Percussion
Branco Cotes - Percussion
Jamie Davis - Bass Guitar
Laura Baskervill - Violin
Hannah Furgiuele - Violin, Viola
Bruce Comings - Bass Guitar

Special guests
Christian Newman (tenor) - Vocals
Martha Gardner - Violin
Mariya Potapova - Violin
Kara Poorbaugh - Viola
Debra Darling - Vocals
Ralph McGibbons - Vocals
Todd Scholl, aka FrostyG - Vocals
Seth Kellam - Vocals

Discography
Monkey Robot Soldier (2010)
Dazzling Urbanites (2008)
The Triumphant Return of Black-Eyed Norman (2012)

References

External links

 Sirius.B Official Website

Press
 Feature Article in The Blue Banner on 9/26/2013
 Video of Sirius.B's appearance on radio station 880 The Revolution on 3/15/2010
 Mountain XPress Band Description

Gypsy punk groups
Indie rock musical groups from North Carolina
American world music groups
Musical groups established in 2006